Nicaraguan Sign Language (ISN) is a form of sign language which developed spontaneously among deaf children in a number of schools in Nicaragua in the 1980s. It is of particular interest to linguists as it offers them a unique opportunity to study what they believe to be the birth of a new language.

History
Before the 1970s a deaf community largely socializing with and amongst each other was not present in Nicaragua. Deaf people were generally isolated from one another and mostly used simple home sign systems and gesture to communicate with their families and friends, though there were several cases of idioglossia among deaf siblings. The conditions necessary for a language to arise occurred in 1977, when a center for special education established a scheme which was initially attended by 50 deaf children. The number of pupils at the school (in the Managua neighborhood of San Judas) then grew to 100 by 1979, the beginning of the Sandinista Revolution.

In 1980 a vocational school for deaf adolescents was opened in the Villa Libertad area of Managua. By 1983 more than 400 deaf pupils were enrolled in the two schools. Initially the language scheme emphasized spoken Spanish and lipreading, and the use of signs by teachers was limited to fingerspelling (using simple signs to sign the alphabet).

The scheme achieved little success, with most pupils failing to grasp the concept of Spanish words. The children subsequently remained linguistically disconnected from their teachers, but the schoolyard, the street, and the school bus, provided fertile ground for them to communicate with one another. By combining gestures and elements of their home-sign systems, a pidgin-like form and a creole-like language rapidly emerged — they were creating their own language. The "first-stage" pidgin has been called  (LSN) and is still used by many who attended the school at the time.

Staff at the school, unaware of the development of this new language, saw the children's gesturing as mime and a failure to acquire Spanish. Unable to understand what the children were saying, they asked for outside help. In June 1986 the Nicaraguan Ministry of Education contacted Judy Kegl, an American Sign Language linguist from MIT. As Kegl and other researchers began to analyze the language they noticed that the young children had taken the pidgin-like form of the older children to a higher level of complexity, with verb agreement and other conventions of grammar.

From the beginning of her research until Nicaraguan Sign Language was well established, Kegl carefully avoided introducing the sign languages that she knew, in particular American Sign Language, to the deaf community in Nicaragua. A type of linguistic imperialism had been occurring internationally for decades, in which individuals would introduce ASL to populations of deaf people in other countries, often supplanting existing local sign languages. Kegl's policy was to document and study rather than to impose or change the language or its community. Whilst she did not interfere with deaf Nicaraguans gaining exposure to other sign languages, she did not introduce such opportunities. She has, however, documented contact and influences with other sign languages that have occurred since the 1990s. Critics, such as Felicia Ackerman, have taken issue with the ethics of isolating the Nicaraguan children.

Kegl's organization, Nicaraguan Sign Language Projects, helped establish a deaf school staffed entirely by deaf Nicaraguan teachers and has supported deaf Nicaraguans in attending and presenting at international conferences.

Linguistics
ISN offers a rare opportunity to study the emergence of a new language. Before ISN, studies of the early development of languages had focused on creoles, which develop from the mixture of two (or more) distinct communities of fluent speakers. In contrast, ISN was developed by a group of young people with only non-conventional home sign systems and gesture.

Some linguists, such as Kegl and R. J. Senghas, view the sign language development in Managua as proof that language acquisition is hard-wired inside the human brain. Steven Pinker, author of The Language Instinct, claims that "The Nicaraguan case is absolutely unique in history ... We've been able to see how it is that children—not adults—generate language, and we have been able to record it happening in great scientific detail. And it's the only time that we've actually seen a language being created out of thin air."

Since 1990, other researchers including Ann Senghas, Marie Coppola, Richard Senghas, Laura Polich and Jennie Pyers, have begun to study and report on the development of this unique language and its community. Since then, whilst researchers have their own interpretations of the events leading to the language and its development since, all agree that to date, the phenomenon being studied is one of the richest sources of data on language emergence discovered.

Structure
Bierma provides a good foundation to ISN structures. He takes as an example "rolling down". While a person may visualize this as one motion, ISN splits this action into two parts, manner and direction. These smaller parts allow for them to be rearranged to create different phrases. The most sophisticated speakers use an A-B-A speech pattern; in our example, this reflects the signs roll-down-roll, to note that the rolling down motion is continuous, not that the subject rolled and then descended.

Spatial modulation

Spatial modulations are the building blocks of all sign languages studied to date. A neutrally placed sign is in front of the chest; however, a sign can be modulated, or directionally altered, to convey many grammatical changes.

Spatial modulations can perform functions including "indicating person or number; providing deictic, locative, or temporal information; or indicating grammatical relationships".

In the article written by Senghas and Coppola, they explore spatial modulation as it occurs in ISN. They found that this movement from the neutral space was much more common among signers who began learning at a younger age than their peers who did so when they were older. Taking this into consideration (as well as their studies on spatial modulations for indicating shared reference and the speed at which signers at different stages of learning signed), Senghas and Coppola determined that child learners are creating Nicaraguan Sign Language – they "changed the language as they learned it". The fact that students who began signing at a younger age use spatial modulation more often than their older peers, who began signing at ISN's conception, is indicative that the language matures as the younger cohorts make the grammar more complex. They go on to note that it is only when a language is not matured, such as with ISN, that language-learning abilities show their transformational and creative capacity.

In the signing space, the use of pointing to indicate referent identity has increased greatly since the 1980s. Points can serve a "pronoun-like function, coordinating with the spatial modulations to verbs, to indicate the argument structure of the sentence, and to co-index referents across discourse".

Senghas and Coppola have noted that signers who learned ISN before the Extensive Contact Period (before 1983) were inconsistent in whether an event was represented as rotated or reflected (unrotated) in the signing space. If the signer was watching an event where a man on the signer's left gave an object to a woman on the signer's right, it was at random (when the signer reiterated the scene) whether or not the signer would use spatial modulation to mark left and right based on his view from in front of the scene or as if the signer were facing the same way as the actors in the scene.

Signers who began learning after 1983 were not inconsistent in that way. Across multiple signers and multiple scenes, signers would apply the same rotated representation. Senghas and Coppola suggested that this meant that "spatial modulations are being used as a shared grammatical element among this age cohort".

Academic interpretation

When it became language 
Researchers disagree regarding at what stage in the development of ISN that it became a full-fledged language.

 Coppola argues that isolated family-signed systems in Nicaragua contained components that can be called linguistic (but that does not mean she equates homesign with language). 
 Kegl argues that following an intermediate stage when deaf contact gesturers came together and developed a communication sufficient to make young children think their input was a language to be acquired, the first generation of young children acquired a language as complete and rich as any human language known to date; subsequent changes constitute an expected process of historical change. 
 Senghas argues that once ISN came into being, it became more and more complex over successive cohorts of young acquirers.

Evidence for innate language capacities 
William Stokoe, known by many as the father of American Sign Language linguistics, disagreed that the emergence of ISN is evidence of a language acquisition device. Stokoe also questions assertions that the language has emerged entirely without outside influence from, for example, Spanish or ASL. There is so far no final evidence available to resolve the controversy surrounding nativism v. cultural learning, and the dispute reaches far into theoretical linguistics, the approaches of which may conceptualize grammar in different and incompatible ways. Even if the evidence collected seems to indicate a lack of access to Spanish and ASL in the early emergence process, the possibility remains that the development of ISN is facilitated by the speaker's exposure to more general communicative strategies in early infancy.

Alternatives to theories proposing a language acquisition device have been presented by Michael Tomasello (among others). Tomasello argues that the process of acquiring a first language is boosted by non-linguistic communication, as in the establishment of joint intentional frames and in the understanding of communicative intentions.

In any case, once ISN came into being, like other languages it actively engaged in contact with languages in its environment.

As "unwritable" 
R. J. Senghas (1997) used the phrase "unspeakable, unwritable" language in the title of his dissertation to highlight the common misconception that those languages without a written form are not as "real" (a view often held by those who do not study indigenous languages). In a similar fashion, sign languages are often not given proper recognition because they are not spoken or written. (Senghas has never claimed that Nicaraguan Sign Language is unwritable, just that it was often thought of as such by those who do not study sign languages.)

Generally, the influence literacy has on the status of a language is also addressed in debates of the so-called "written language paradigm" in which it is acknowledged that the availability of written language to some extent must be considered as a culturally and historically dependent phenomenon. Tim Ingold, a British anthropologist, discussed these matters at some length in Perception of the Environment (2000), though he does not specifically deal with ISN. Since 1996, however, Nicaraguans have been writing their language by hand and on computer using SignWriting. There are now many texts written in Nicaraguan Sign Language, including three volumes of reading lessons in ISN, Spanish I and II (two levels of texts, workbooks and primers),  (a collection of stories in Spanish with ISN glossaries), and a geography text.

See also

 Deafness in Nicaragua
 Adamorobe Sign Language
 Al-Sayyid Bedouin Sign Language
 Kata Kolok
 Martha's Vineyard Sign Language
 Yucatec Maya Sign Language

References

Further reading
Coppola, M. 2002. The emergence of grammatical categories in home sign: Evidence from family-based gesture systems in Nicaragua. Ph.D. Dissertation, Dept. of Brain and Cognitive Sciences, University of Rochester, Rochester, NY.
Coppola, M. and E. L. Newport. 2005. Grammatical Subjects in home sign: Abstract linguistic structure in adult primary gesture systems without linguistic input. Proceedings of the National Academy of Sciences 102(52): 19249–19253.
Coppola, M. and A. Senghas. 2010. Deixis in an emerging sign language. In Brentari, Diane, (ed) Sign Languages: A Cambridge Language Survey. Cambridge, UK: Cambridge University Press, pp. 543–569.
Kegl, J. 1994. Conference Report: Linguistic Society of America Meeting, January 6–9, 1994. Signpost. vol.7, no. 1, Spring, pp. 62–66.
Kegl, J. 1994. The Nicaraguan Sign Language Project: An Overview. Signpost.  vol.7, no. 1, Spring, pp. 24–31.
Senghas, R., and J. Kegl. 1994a. Social Considerations in the Emergence of Idioma de Signos Nicaragüense (Nicaraguan Sign Language). Signpost. vol.7, no. 1, Spring, pp. 40–46.
Senghas, R., and J. Kegl. 1994b. Soziale Gesichtspunkte bei der Herausbildung der Nicaraguanishen Gebärdensprache. Das Zeichen, no. 29, September, pp. 288–293. [German translation of Senghas and Kegl (1994a)]
Kegl, J. 2000. Is it soup yet? Or, When is it Language? In the Proceedings of the Child Language Seminar 1999. City University, London.
Kegl, J. 2004. Language Emergence in a Language-Ready Brain: Acquisition Issues. In Jenkins, Lyle, (ed), Biolinguistics and the Evolution of Language. John Benjamins.
Kegl, J. (2008). The Case of Signed Languages in the Context of Pidgin and Creole Studies. In Singler, J. and Kouwenberg, S. (eds.), The Handbook of Pidgin and Creole Studies. London: Blackwell's Publishers. pp. 491–511.
Kegl, J. and G. Iwata. 1989. Lenguaje de Signos Nicaragüense: A Pidgin Sheds Light on the "Creole?" ASL. In Carlson, R., S. DeLancey, S. Gildea, D. Payne, and A. Saxena, (eds.). Proceedings of the Fourth Meetings of the Pacific Linguistics Conference. Eugene, Oregon: Department of Linguistics, University of Oregon, pp. 266–294.
Morford, J. P. & Kegl, J. 2000. Gestural precursors of linguistic constructs: How input shapes the form of language. In D. McNeill (Ed.), Language and Gesture. Cambridge: Cambridge University Press, pp. 358–387.
 Kegl J., Senghas A., Coppola M 1999. Creation through contact: Sign language emergence and sign language change in Nicaragua. In M. DeGraff (ed), Comparative Grammatical Change: The Intersection of Language Acquisistion, Creole Genesis, and Diachronic Syntax, pp. 179–237. Cambridge, Massachusetts: MIT Press.
 Polich, L. 1998. Social agency and deaf communities: A Nicaraguan case study. University of Texas at Austin Ph.D. dissertation
 Polich, L. 2005. The Emergence of the deaf community in Nicaragua: "With sign language you can learn so much." Washington, DC: Gallaudet University Press.
Pyers, J. E., and A. Senghas (2006). Referential shift in Nicaraguan Sign Language: A comparison with American Sign Language. In P. Perniss, R. Pfau, and M. Steinbach, (Eds.), Visible variation: Comparative studies on sign language structure. Berlin: Mouton de Gruyter.
 Saffran, J. R., A. Senghas, and J. C. Trueswell. (2001). The acquisition of language by children. Proceedings of the National Academy of Sciences, 98: 23, 12874–12875.
 Senghas, A. (1994). Nicaragua's lessons for language acquisition. Signpost: The Journal of the International Sign Linguistics Association, 7:1, spring 1994.
 Senghas, A. (1995). Children's contribution to the birth of Nicaraguan Sign Language. Ph.D. dissertation, Massachusetts Institute of Technology. Distributed by MIT Working Papers in Linguistics.
 Senghas, A. (1995). Conventionalization in the first generation: a community acquires a language. USD Journal of Contemporary Legal Issues, 6, Spring, 1995.
 Senghas, A. (2005). Language emergence: Clues from a new Bedouin sign language. Current Biology, 15:12, 463–465.
 Senghas, A., A. Özyürek, and S. Kita (2005). Language emergence in vitro or in vivo? Response to comment on "Children creating core properties of language: evidence from an emerging sign language in Nicaragua" Science, 309: 5731, 56.
 Senghas, A., A. Özyürek, and S. Kita. (2002). Encoding motion events in an emerging sign language: From Nicaraguan gestures to Nicaraguan signs. In A. Baker, B. van den Bogaerde & O. Crasborn (Eds.) Cross-linguistic perspectives in sign language research. Selected papers from TISLR 2000. Hamburg: Signum Press.
 Senghas, A., D. Roman, and S. Mavillapalli (2006). Simplemente Unico: Lo que la Comunidad Sorda de Nicaragua le Puede Enseñar al Mundo [Simply Unique: What the Nicaraguan Deaf Community Can Teach the World]. London/Managua: Leonard Cheshire International.
 Senghas, A., S. Kita, and A. Özyürek (2004). Children creating core properties of language: evidence from an emerging sign language in Nicaragua. Science, 305: 5691, 1779–1782.
 Senghas, R. J 1997. An 'unspeakable, unwriteable' language: Deaf identity, language & personhood among the first cohorts of Nicaraguan signers. University of Rochester, NY Ph.D. dissertation
 Senghas, R. J. 2003. New ways to be Deaf in Nicaragua: Changes in language, personhood, and community. In Monaghan, L., Nakamura, K., Schmaling, C., and Turner, G. H. (eds.), Many ways to be Deaf: International, linguistic, and sociocultural variation. Washington, DC. Gallaudet University Press, pp. 260–282.
Shepard-Kegl, J. A. 1997. Prólogo. In Lopez Gomez, J.J., Peréz Castellon, A. M., Rivera Rostrán, J. M., and Baltodano Baltodano, J.F., (eds.), Diccionario del Idioma de Señas de Nicaragua. Managua: Asociación Nacional se Sordos de Nicaragua (ANSNIC), pp. ix–xi.
Shepard-Kegl, J.M. 2002. Teaching Literacy to Deaf Students in Nicaragua: A Common Sense Two-Step Approach. Yarmouth, ME: NSLP, Inc. (downloadable at https://web.archive.org/web/20051226020247/http://www.nslpinc.org/Download.html)
 Michael Tomasello 2005, Constructing a Language: A Usage-Based Theory of Language Acquisition. Harvard University Press

External links
 5 minute PBS documentary video showing examples of Nicaraguan Sign Language (QuickTime and RealPlayer formats).
 http://www.unet.maine.edu/courses/NSLP/ (Archived Version, 2009)
 https://www.nytimes.com/library/magazine/home/19991024mag-sign-language.html
 http://www-news.uchicago.edu/citations/04/041014.coppola-ct.html
 Documentary film about efforts to spread Nicaraguan Sign Language to rural communities.
 The invention of Nicaraguan Sign Language puts the alternative view
 Sign: A Game About Being Understood, a game that explores the experiences of the deaf students at the Managua school

Sign language isolates
Languages of Nicaragua
Sign languages
Languages attested from the 1980s
1980s establishments in Nicaragua